Toreulia nimia is a species of moth of the family Tortricidae. It is found in Ecuador in the provinces of Pichincha and Cotopaxi.

The wingspan is 21.5–32 mm.  The ground colour of the forewings is chestnut brown.

References

Moths described in 2000
Euliini